The 1996 Italian Superturismo Championship was the tenth edition of the Italian Superturismo Championship. The season began in Mugello on 14 April and finished in Vallelunga on 6 October, after ten rounds. Rinaldo Capello won the championship, driving an Audi A4 Quattro; BMW won the constructors' championship, while Roberto Colciago took the privateers' trophy.

Teams and drivers

Race calendar and results

Championship standings

 8 results from 10 are valid for the championship in the firsts five rounds
 8 results from 10 are valid for the championship in the seconds five rounds

Drivers' Championship

Manufacturers' Trophy

Privateers' Championship

External links
1996 Drivers List
1996 Standings

Italian Superturismo Championship